Six ships of the Royal Navy have been named HMS Snipe:

  was a 12-gun gun-brig launched in 1801 and broken up in 1846.
  was a cutter launched in 1828 and broken up in 1860.
  was a  launched in 1860 and broken up in 1868.
  was a Coastguard vessel launched in 1874 which foundered in 1914.
  was a river gunboat launched in 1898 and sold in 1919
  was a  sloop launched in 1945 and scrapped in 1960

Royal Navy ship names